"Should Have Known Better" is a song by American singer-songwriter and multi-instrumentalist Sufjan Stevens. It is the second track and second single from his seventh studio album, Carrie & Lowell, and was released digitally on March 11, 2015 on Asthmatic Kitty. A one-track promotional CD was later released on Asthmatic Kitty but was not available for sale.

Critical reception
"Should Have Known Better" received positive reviews from contemporary music critics. The song was chosen upon release as Pitchfork Media's "Best New Track". Jeremy Gordon stated that, " 'Should Have Known Better' takes us back to the beginning he remembers, where Carrie leaves him in a video store at the age of 'three, maybe four.' In a hushed voice, he sings like he's clinging onto a blanket for warmth as he fixates on the black shroud that enveloped him in the wake of her absence, muting his ability to transparently express himself." Gordon continues, "But halfway through, an uplifting electric keyboard line kicks in; a subtle percussive note steadily taps out a reminder to keep going; his voice shakes off the ice and forms a chorus with itself, flowering into something hopeful. Sufjan flips the melody from the black shroud into a tender lyric about shoving aside his fear, discovering an oasis of perspective when he looks to his brother's newborn daughter and sees his mother in her face. When he sings 'nothing can be changed,' he doesn't sound resigned, but ready to look forward. It's the dawn at the end of a long night, a prayer that past traumas might be healed by a beautiful present."

References

External links
 

2015 singles
2015 songs
Asthmatic Kitty singles
Song recordings produced by Doveman
Sufjan Stevens songs